

Events
Cleveland Black Hand leader Rosario Borgio and three others are convicted of the murder of several Akron police officers and executed. 
Al Capone leaves New York, after an altercation with a member of the White Hand Gang, going to Chicago, where he becomes a top lieutenant to Johnny Torrio. 
Recently imprisoned criminal Joe Valachi encounters inmate and future mentor New York mobster Alessandro Vollero. 
Salvatore Sabella becomes leader of the Philadelphia crime syndicate. 
Frank Costello forms a novelty company which makes Kewpie dolls in punchboard games.  By the following year Costello had made $80,000 ($ million today), which he used to become a bootlegger at the start of Prohibition.
July 29 – New York labor slugger Johnny Spanish is killed by three unidentified gunman possibly including rival gangster Nathan Kaplan.

Births
James "Jimmy Brown" Failla, senior caporegime for the Gambino crime family and labor union racketeer
Gennaro Jay "Jerry" Angiulo, former Patriarca crime family underboss
January 14 – Giulio Andreotti, Italian Prime Minister and mafia associate
April 21 – Licio Gelli, Italian mason and mafia associate

Deaths
May 22 – Rosario Borgio, Cleveland Black Hand leader
July 29 – Johnny Spanish, Five Points Gang member and labor racketeer

References 

Organized crime
Years in organized crime